The Hatbox Ghost is an animatronic character that appeared originally in the Haunted Mansion at Disneyland but was removed shortly after the attraction's debut in 1969. Located formerly in the ride's attic scene, the figure is described as "an elderly [male] ghost in a cloak and top hat, leaning on a cane with a wavering hand and clutching a hatbox in the other." After decades, the character was added to the attraction in 2015.

Idea
The idea behind the Hatbox Ghost figure was for its head to vanish from atop its shoulders and reappear alternately inside the hatbox, in time with an adjacent bride figure's beating heart. According to Imagineer Chris Merritt in an interview with DoomBuggies.com, the effect was never completely successful due to the illusion's close proximity to the ride vehicles:

"The gag was based purely on lighting. The ghost's head was illuminated by black lighting. A light inside the hatbox he held would rhythmically illuminate and hide the head in the hatbox, while, in tandem, the actual head on the ghost's shoulders would be hidden by extinguishing the black lighting."

Implementation and decommissioning
The Hatbox Ghost figure was installed inside The Haunted Mansion and in place for cast member (park employee) previews on the nights of August 7 and 8, 1969. Almost immediately, it became apparent that the effect had failed, as ambient light in the attraction's attic scene prevented the specter's face from disappearing fully, despite its designated spotlight going dark. Attempts were made to remedy technical problems, but the effect was not convincing enough, and the ghost was decommissioned after a few months. A photo of the figure in situ is featured on the Doombuggies.com website. And on the DVD, "Disneyland Resort: Imagineering the Magic," Senior Vice President of Creative Development at Walt Disney Imagineering Tony Baxter displays an attraction maintenance slip that lists the original Hatbox Ghost.

While a definite record of what became of the Hatbox Ghost figure has not been published, there are speculations as to its fate. One report claims that its parts were recycled into one of the Eagle Sam audio-animatronics used in the America Sings attraction which opened at Disneyland in 1974, but this appears unlikely due to the simplicity of the design and construction of the Hatbox Ghost figure.

In culture
In the 2003 House of Mouse episode "House Ghosts", he appears to scare Pete along with the Hitchhiking Ghosts, the Lonesome Ghosts, the Executioner, the Skeletons from The Skeleton Dance, and the Bride.

In 2009, the Hatbox Ghost appeared repeatedly in art and souvenirs created for the 40th anniversary of The Haunted Mansion, in response to fan interest in the character. Artists Kevin Kidney and Jody Daily crafted their version of a life-sized replica of The Hatbox Ghost that was auctioned for $9,400 at the first D23 Expo, held in September of the same year. In addition, The Hatbox Ghost was the official "spooksperson" for Disneyland Resort's 2009 O-pin House pin trading event and Haunted Holidays celebration.

In July 2010, director Guillermo del Toro, participating in a panel discussion at Comic-Con, announced his involvement as cowriter and producer in a new film based on The Haunted Mansion attraction. He stated that, in his version of the ride's story, The Hatbox Ghost will be a pivotal character. While this version of the film would never materialize, the Hatbox Ghost is set to be a prominent part of Justin Simien's Haunted Mansion film, where he is set to be played by Jared Leto.

In August at the 2013 D23 Expo, a new Hatbox Ghost animatronic was displayed at the "Journey Into Imagineering" exhibit. Contrary to the original figure's hunched over appearance, this figure stood straight and tall, and did not hold a hatbox. There had been no word from Disney on whether the figure was built solely for the D23 exhibit, or whether the figure would make an appearance in the attraction at some point.

The Hatbox Ghost appear as a playable character in the video games Disney Crossy Road and Disney Magic Kingdoms.

The Hatbox Ghost is featured in two comic book adaptations of the Haunted Mansion. In the 2005 Slave Labor Graphics Haunted Mansion anthology series, the Hatbox Ghost plays a role in the "Mystery of the Manse" origin story serial, being the ghost of Randall Pace, a ship captain and gunrunner that was beheaded after his first mate William Gracey mutinied against him. When Madame Leota summons spirits to ruin Gracey's wedding years later, he frightens the bride to death when reclaiming his head and telling her the truth of Gracey's pirate past. In the 2016 Disney Kingdoms miniseries adaptation of the Haunted Mansion, the Hatbox Ghost is one of four legendary ghosts that died within the Mansion that control some of its supernatural powers. Leaning on his long absence from the attraction, the Hatbox Ghost is depicted as a wise world traveler that has journeyed to different haunted locations connected to the Mansion by way of the M.C. Escher-like Endless Staircase seen in the Florida attraction.

In the 2021 Muppets Haunted Mansion Halloween special, Fozzie Bear plays the role of Gauzey the Hatbox Bear.

Return
After the end of the 2014 Haunted Mansion Holiday overlay, and when the Mansion was returned to its original state, guests observed what appeared to be a temporary work wall at the end of the attic scene. This created much speculation that the Hatbox Ghost would return as part of the park's 60th anniversary.

On April 10, 2015, it was officially confirmed that the Hatbox Ghost figure would return to Disneyland's Haunted Mansion in May 2015. It was later announced that the first day of the character's return would be May 9, 2015.

The 2015 installation of the Hatbox Ghost figure is a new animatronic, designed to resemble the original. The new version's face is an animation that is projected onto the figure, similarly to the "Constance the Bride" figure. The character looks back and forth and narrows his eyes before his head dissolves into mist and vanishes. As the head vanishes, a chuckle can be heard. The head then appears inside the hatbox before vanishing into the shadows again, but without an accompanying chuckle or any mist.

On September 11, 2022, the official Disney Parks team announced the Hatbox Ghost would make its debut at Walt Disney World's Haunted Mansion in 2023.

References

Haunted Mansion
Fictional ghosts
Characters of the Disney theme parks
Audio-Animatronics
Fictional characters introduced in 1969